The 98th Indian Infantry Brigade was an infantry brigade formation of the Indian Army during World War II. It was formed in April 1941, at Bareilly. The brigade served with three different divisions in the Burma Campaign. The 34th Indian Infantry Division between October 1941 and January 1942. The 25th Indian Infantry Division between January and March 1942 and the 19th Indian Infantry Division from March 1942, until the end of the war, fighting in the Burma Campaign.

Formation
8th Battalion 14th Punjab Regiment April 1941 to July 1942
9th Battalion 13th Frontier Force Rifles September 1941 to July 1942
8th Battalion 12th Frontier Force Regiment March 1942 to August 1945
3rd Battalion 6th Rajputana Rifles July 1942 to September 1943
2nd Battalion Royal Berkshire Regiment January 1943 to June 1945
4th Battalion 4th Gurkha Rifles September 1943 to August 1945
MG Battalion 11th Sikh Regiment January 1945
1st Battalion 15th Punjab Regiment March 1945
5th Battalion 10th Baluch Regiment March 1945

See also

 List of Indian Army Brigades in World War II

References

British Indian Army brigades
Military units and formations in Burma in World War II
Military units and formations established in 1941
Military units and formations disestablished in 1945